The 2012 Palmer Cup was held on 28–30 June 2012 at the Royal County Down Golf Club in Newcastle, County Down, Northern Ireland. Europe won 13½–10½. The United States led 10–6 at the start of the final day but Europe won 7 of the 8 singles matches and halved the other to win the match.

Format
On Thursday, there were four matches of four-ball in the morning, followed by four foursomes matches in the afternoon. Eight singles matches were played on Friday, and eight more on Saturday. In all, 24 matches were played.

Each of the 24 matches was worth one point in the larger team competition. If a match was all square after the 18th hole, each side earned half a point toward their team total. The team that accumulated at least 12½ points won the competition.

Teams
Eight college golfers from Europe and the United States participated in the event.

Thursday's matches

Morning four-ball

Afternoon foursomes

Friday's singles matches

Saturday's singles matches

Michael Carter award
The Michael Carter Award winners were Robert S. Karlsson and Andrew Yun.

References

External links
Palmer Cup official site

2012
2012 Palmer Cup
2012 Palmer Cup
2012 in golf
2012 in Northern Ireland sport
June 2012 sports events in Europe